Felixberto Camacho Flores (January 23, 1921 - October 25, 1985) was a Roman Catholic prelate who served as Archbishop of Agana from April 21, 1971, to his death October 25, 1985.

Born in Agaña, Guam, Flores was ordained a priest on April 30, 1945, in the Capuchin order. On February 5, 1970, he was appointed apostolic administrator of Agaña and titular bishop of Stagnum and was consecrated on May 17, 1970. On May 24, 1971, he was appointed bishop of the Agaña Diocese and then was appointed archbishop of Agaña. He died while still in office.

Notes

1921 births
1985 deaths
Guamanian Roman Catholic bishops
20th-century Roman Catholic bishops in the United States
People from Hagåtña, Guam
Roman Catholic bishops of Agaña
Roman Catholic archbishops of Agaña